Hanna Blomstrand (born 25 August 1996) is a Swedish previous handball player for København Håndbold and the Swedish national team.

Career
She began playing handball in H 65 Höör, a Swedish club which won the national championship 2016. In the Swedish championship for youth, she won the title for girls born 1996, 16 years old. After that she moved to Lugi HF 2012, where she played to 2017. In 2017, she became professional handball player in the danish club København Håndbold.

National teams
She has been playing for the national youth team in Sweden and won a gold medal in 2013 EM and the next year bronze medal in youth OS in China. In 2015, she won bronze in U-19 team in EM. In season 2015–2016, she was second in list of goal-scorers, and in summer 2016, she began playing for the national team instead of the youth team. In the summer Olympics 2016, she only played one match after an injury of another player. But she was also playing in EM 2016 in Sweden where she played in several matches. In WM 2017, she was a more important player, and in quarterfinal against Denmark, she became player of the match after 7 goals on seven shots.

Achievements
 National championship  2013 Silver with Lugi HF
 U-17 EM 2013 Gold with Swedish team
 Youth OS 2014 Brons with Swedish team
 U-19 EM 2015 Brons with Swedish team

References

External links

1996 births
Living people
Swedish female handball players
Handball players at the 2014 Summer Youth Olympics
Handball players at the 2016 Summer Olympics
Olympic handball players of Sweden
Lugi HF players
Expatriate handball players
Swedish expatriate sportspeople in Denmark